Situ was one of the highest ranking government offices in ancient China.

During the Han dynasty, the title became written with the different characters , which is translated variously as Minister over the Masses or Excellency over the Masses. It was one of the three most important official posts during the Han dynasty, called the Three Excellencies. The nominal salary for the post was 20,000 dàn of grain.

The title is the origin of the surname Situ.

See also 
 Government of the Han dynasty
 Tai Situpa (Grand Situ)
 Translation of Han dynasty titles

References

Citations

Sources 

 
 

Situ
Obsolete occupations
Government of Imperial China
Zhou dynasty
Han dynasty